Nadine Jarosch (born 28 April 1995) is a German gymnast. She competed for the national team at the 2012 Summer Olympics in the Women's artistic team all-around.

References

German female artistic gymnasts
Living people
Olympic gymnasts of Germany
Gymnasts at the 2012 Summer Olympics
1995 births